Ernst van der Beugel (2 February 1918, Amsterdam – 29 September 2004, The Hague) was a Dutch economist, businessman, diplomat, and politician of the Labour Party.

Education
Van der Beugel graduated in economics from the University of Amsterdam in 1941 and received a Ph.D. from Erasmus University Rotterdam in 1966 on the dissertation From Marshall plan to Atlantic Partnership (with a foreword of Henry A. Kissinger).

Life's work
In 1945 he joined the Dutch Ministry of Transport, moving to the Ministry of Economic affairs in 1946.  In 1947 he was Secretary to the Dutch national delegation at the first Paris conference on the Marshall Plan. Between 1957 and 1958 he was statesecretary for foreign affairs for the Labour Party in the fourth Cabinet Drees. He took over as permanent secretary of the Bilderberg Group in 1960, upon the death of Józef Retinger. From 1961 to 1963 he was president of Dutch airline KLM. 
From 1966 to 1984 he was professor of international relations at Leiden University.

Family
His sister was the author and journalist  (1914–2003).

Publications
 Albertine Bloemendal: Reframing the Diplomat. Ernst van der Beugel and the Cold War Atlantic Community. Leiden, Brill, 2018.   ( Partly open access)

Notes

External links
Interview with E. H. van der Beugel at the Truman Library

1918 births
2004 deaths
Dutch chief executives in the airline industry
20th-century Dutch diplomats
Members of the Steering Committee of the Bilderberg Group
State Secretaries for Foreign Affairs of the Netherlands
Businesspeople from Amsterdam
University of Amsterdam alumni
Erasmus University Rotterdam alumni
Academic staff of Leiden University
20th-century Dutch economists
Labour Party (Netherlands) politicians
20th-century Dutch businesspeople